MarkLogic Corporation is an American software business that develops and provides an enterprise NoSQL database, also named MarkLogic. The company was founded in 2001 and is based in San Carlos, California. MarkLogic is a privately held company with over 500 employees and was acquired by Vector Capital in October 2020. It has offices in the United States, Europe, Asia, and Australia.

The company claims to have over 1,000 customers, including Chevron, JPMorgan Chase, Erie Insurance Group, Johnson & Johnson, and the US Army. It also claims that six of the top ten global banks are MarkLogic customers.

In 2016 Forrester Research ranked MarkLogic as one of the nine leading NoSQL database vendors in the market, and appeared in several Gartner Magic Quadrant reports for Operational Database Management Systems. In 2017, Gartner ranked MarkLogic as a 'Visionary' in the data warehouse market.

History
MarkLogic was first named Cerisent and was founded in 2001 by Christopher Lindblad, who was the Chief Architect of the Ultraseek search engine at Infoseek, and Paul Pedersen, a professor of computer science at Cornell University  and UCLA, and Frank R. Caufield, Founder of Darwin Ventures, to address shortcomings with existing search and data products. The product first focused on using XML document markup standard and XQuery as the query standard for accessing collections of documents up to hundreds of terabytes in size.

In 2009 IDC mentioned MarkLogic in a report as one of the top Innovative Information Access Companies with under $100 million in revenue.

In May 2012, Gary Bloom was appointed as Chief Executive Officer. He held senior positions at Symantec Corporation, Veritas Software, and Oracle.

Post-acquisition, the company named Jeffrey Casale as its new CEO. The company continues to innovate and has recently released MarkLogic 10 and DataHub 5.

Funding 
The company received additional funding of $15 million in 2007 from its existing investors Sequoia and Lehman. The same investors put another $12.5 million into the company in 2009.

On 12 April 2013, MarkLogic received an additional  in funding, led by Sequoia Capital and Tenaya Capital. On May 12, 2015, MarkLogic received an additional  in funding, led by Wellington Management Company, with contributions from Arrowpoint Partners and existing backers, Sequoia Capital, Tenaya Capital, and Northgate Capital.

NTT Data announced a strategic investment in MarkLogic on 31 May 2017.

Products

The MarkLogic product is considered a multi-model NoSQL database for its ability to store, manage, and search JSON and XML documents and semantic data (RDF triples).

Releases 
 2001  Cerisent XQE 1.0
 2004  Cerisent XQE 2.0
 2005  MarkLogic Server 3.0
 2006  MarkLogic Server 3.1
 2007  MarkLogic Server 3.2
 2008  MarkLogic Server 4.0
 2009  MarkLogic Server 4.1
 2010  MarkLogic Server 4.2
 2011  MarkLogic Server 5.0
 2012  MarkLogic Server 6.0
 2013  MarkLogic Server 7.0
 2015  MarkLogic Server 8.0: Ability to store JSON data and process data using JavaScript.
 2017  MarkLogic Server 9.0: Data integration across Relational and Non-Relational data.
 2019  MarkLogic Server 10.0

Licensing and support
MarkLogic is proprietary software, available under a freeware developer software license or a commercial "Essential Enterprise" license. Licenses are available from MarkLogic or directly from cloud marketplaces such as Amazon Web Services and Microsoft Azure.

Technology
MarkLogic is a multi-model NoSQL database that has evolved from its XML database roots to also natively store JSON documents and RDF triples for its semantic data model. It uses a distributed architecture that can handle hundreds of billions of documents and hundreds of terabytes of data. MarkLogic maintains ACID consistency for transactions and has a Common Criteria certification security model, high availability and disaster recovery. It is designed to run on-premises within public or private cloud computing environments like Amazon Web Services.

MarkLogic's Enterprise NoSQL database platform is used in publishing, government, finance and other sectors, with hundreds of large-scale systems in production.

See also

 Document database
 Graph database
 Multi-model database
 NoSQL
 Triple store
 MongoDB

References

Further reading 
 Fowler, Adam. "NoSQL for Dummies". , 9781118905623.
 Taylor, Allen. "Semantics for Dummies". .
 Hunter, Jason. "Inside MarkLogic Server"
 McCreary, Dan, and Ann Kelly. Making Sense of NoSQL. Manning Publications Co. August 2012. . 
 Zhang, Andy. Beginning MarkLogic with XQuery and MarkLogic Server. Champion Writers, Inc. 24 June 2009. .

NoSQL companies
Software companies based in California
Companies established in 2001
Companies based in San Carlos, California
Big data companies
Software companies of the United States